Gołąb  is a village in the administrative district of Gmina Puławy, within Puławy County, Lublin Voivodeship, in eastern Poland.

As of 2011, the population of the village is 2227.

Gołąb means "pigeon" in Polish.

Monuments 
 Saints Catherine and Florian Church
 Loreto House
 A figure of John of Nepomuk
 Museum of Unusual Bicycles.

History 
The first historical mention of the town was in the XII century. The parish church was constructed between 1628–1636, and the Loreto House was constructed between 1634 and 1638.

An invading Swedish army routed a Polish army in the Battle of Gołąb 1656.

The Gołąbska Confederation was found on the 16 October, 1672. 

In 1939, Germans bombed the airport and a nearby lake. A dozen or so women who were washing clothes and bedding by the lake, were mistakenly recognised by paratroopers and died.

References

Villages in Puławy County